The Port of Nantong combines a natural river estuary inland port with an artificial deep water coastal port. It is located at Nantong, Jiangsu, People's Republic of China. In 2013, it had a cargo throughput of 205 million tonnes, a growth of 10.6% over 2012. Container throughput reached 600,500 TEU, a growth of 19.1%.

Setting

Nantong Prefecture has

History

Layout
Nantong Port has 4,166m of Yangtze river quayside, 88 berths, 24 berths over 1,000DWT, or which 14 over 10,000DWT. 65ha of yard space and 5.3ha of warehouses.

Nantong Port has nine river port areas and three coastal port areas.

COASTAL PORT AREAS:  
 Yangkou Port Area 
 Lüsi Port Area 
 Lengjiasha Port Area 
RIVER PORT AREAS: 
 Rugao Port Area : services the Rugao Economic Development Area, focuses on oil products, liquid chemicals and general cargo.
 Tiansheng Port Area: services several power stations and the Gangzha Harborfront Industrial Area. 
 Nantong Port Area: focuses on general cargo and passengers
 Rengang Port Area: focuses on services COSCO and the COSCO-Kawasaki Shipyard. 
 Langshan Port Area: focuses on bulk cargo, containers and break bulk
 Fumin Port Area: services the International Nantong Technology Economic Development Area
 Jianghai Port Area: focuses on break-bulk and petrochemicals.
 Tonghai Port Area: it's a planned comprehensive area for foreign trade. 
 Qihai Port Area

Administration

Operations

References

External links
 Port of Nantung website
 Port of Yangkou Economic Zone website
 Nantong Municipal Harbor Management Bureau

 

Ports and harbours of China
Nantong